Galasa major is a species of snout moth in the genus Galasa. It was described by William Warren in 1891, and is known from Colombia.

References

Moths described in 1891
Chrysauginae